Alvin M. Josephy Jr. (May 18, 1915 – October 16, 2005) was an American historian who specialized in Native American issues.
New York Times reviewer Herbert Mitgang called him in 1982 the "leading non-Indian writer about Native Americans".

Early life
Josephy was born in Woodmere, New York. His mother was a daughter of publisher Samuel Knopf and a sister of Alfred A. Knopf.

Career

Early career
Early in his career, Josephy worked as a Hollywood screenwriter, New York City newspaper correspondent, radio station news director, the Washington Office of War Information, and in the Pacific theater as United States Marine Corps combat correspondent, where he was awarded the Bronze Star Medal for "heroic achievement in action... [making] a recording of historical significance" during the U.S. invasion of Guam.  After the war, Josephy returned to Hollywood where he wrote for the movies, for a local newspaper, and for veterans groups.  There he married his second wife, Elizabeth Peet. Josephy's reporting on organized crime in Santa Monica was the basis for the film The Captive City, which he co-wrote.

Time magazine
Around 1952, the Josephys moved to Greenwich, Connecticut, when Alvin joined Time magazine as photo editor. One assignment sparked his interest in the history of indigenous peoples of the Americas, especially the Nez Perce people, who lived primarily in Oregon and Idaho. He developed that interest largely in his free time.

American Heritage magazine
In 1960, he joined the American Heritage Publishing Company as a senior editor of American Heritage books, and in 1976, became editor-in-chief of American Heritage magazine, a position he served in until 1978.

Literary works
Josephy's works include The Patriot Chiefs (1961); Chief Joseph's People and Their War (1964); The Nez Perce Indians and the Opening of the Northwest (1965); The Indian Heritage of America (New York: Alfred A. Knopf, 1968); Red Power: The American Indians' Fight for Freedom (1971); and Now That the Buffalo's Gone (1982); also Black Hills, White Sky; The Civil War in the American West and History of the Congress of the United States.

Government advisor
Josephy served as a senior advisor on Federal Indian Policy to Secretary of the Interior Stewart Udall during the Kennedy Administration, and later as an advisor to President Richard Nixon on matters pertaining to Native Americans and government policies relating to Indian Tribes. He had strongly disagreed with Eisenhower Administration policies on such matters, as President Nixon came to later, in retrospect.  Prior to this time, more than 100 tribes had lost federal recognition, and their land holdings under Federal policies of "termination" and forced assimilation. Based significantly on Josephy's advice and encouragement, the Nixon Administration adopted a policy of "self-determination" for Native Americans, and furthered policies and practices to encourage their cultural survival.)

Personal life
Alvin and Elizabeth "Betty" Peet Josephy were married for 56 years, until her death in 2004. He died at his home in Greenwich, Connecticut, a year later.  He was survived by one child from his first marriage, three from his second, and their descendants.

Legacy
In Joseph, Oregon, where Alvin and Betty owned a ranch and hosted a camp for Nez Perce children, their legacy is well remembered. The Josephy Center for Arts and Culture was founded in his name. Included in the Center is the Alvin M. and Betty Josephy Library of Western History and Culture, which holds much of Josephy's personal collection, as well as related materials. One of his books, The Nez Perce Indians and the Opening of the Northwest, was included on the list of 100 Oregon Books by the Oregon Cultural Heritage Commission. His papers are held at the Knight Library at the University of Oregon.

Publications

Books

Magazine articles

References

External links
Audio recording of Josephy describing WWII Iwo Jima battle site (on Archive.org)
Alvin M. Josephy, Jr. Sioux Interview Cassettes at the Newberry Library

1915 births
2005 deaths
20th-century American historians
20th-century American male writers
American autobiographers
American book editors
American magazine editors
United States Marine Corps personnel of World War II
Harvard College alumni
Historians of Native Americans
Historians of the American West
Historians of the United States
Horace Mann School alumni
People from Greenwich, Connecticut
People of the United States Office of War Information
United States federal Indian policy
Writers from Connecticut
American male non-fiction writers